The Chevron B6 is a lightweight sports racing car, designed, developed and built by British manufacturer Chevron Cars, in 1967. Only 7 cars were built, which makes it very rare. Over its career, spanning 8 years, it won a total of 15 races, plus 4 additional class wins, clinched 1 pole position, and scored 30 total podium finishes.

References

Chevron racing cars
Sports prototypes
24 Hours of Le Mans race cars
Group 4 (racing) cars
Sports racing cars